Ottmár Szepesi (22 December 1901 – 24 August 1965) was a Hungarian equestrian. He competed in two events at the 1936 Summer Olympics.

References

1901 births
1965 deaths
Hungarian male equestrians
Olympic equestrians of Hungary
Equestrians at the 1936 Summer Olympics
Sportspeople from Budapest